The women's individual recurve competition at the 2001 World Archery Championships took place in September 2001 in Beijing, China. 95 archers entered the competition. Following a qualifying 144 arrow FITA round, the top 64 archers qualified for the 6-round knockout tournament, drawn according to their qualification round scores. The semi-finals and finals then took place on 23 September.

Qualifying
The following archers were the leading 8 qualifiers:

Full draw

Section 1

Section 2

Section 3

Section 4

Finals

References

2001 World Archery Championships
World
Arch